Lake Rukwa is an endorheic lake located the Rukwa Valley of  Rukwa Region, Songwe Region and Katavi Region in southwestern Tanzania. The lake is the third largest inland body of water in the country.

Geography 
Almost half of the lake lies in Uwanda Game Reserve.

Hydrology 
The lake has seen large fluctuations in its size over the years, due to varying inflow of streams. During the early rifting of this part of Africa, the basin of Lake Rukwa may at times have been part of a much larger basin which also included the basins of Lake Tanganyika with Lake Malawi; ancient shorelines suggest a final date of overflow into Lake Tanganyika of 33,000BP. For overflow to occur again, the lake's elevation would need to exceed 900 meters. Overflow into Lake Malawi is not possible now, since the pass between the two basin stands at over 2000 meters elevation. (Neither Lake Tanganyika nor Lake Malawi can overflow into Lake Rukwa since they already overflow into the Atlantic and Indian Oceans respectively.)

There is  an accumulation of selected heavy metals of Zinc, Mercury, Copper, Lead, Chromium and Nickel in sediment, water and muscle tissues of Clarias gariepinus (African catfish) and Oreochromis esculentus (Singida tilapia) fish was done in Lake Rukwa.

Helium discovery
In 2016, an estimated 1.53 billion cubic meters (54.2 billion standard cubic feet) volume of helium gas was discovered in Lake Rukwa worth $3.5 billion.

See also
Rift Valley lakes

References 

Lakes of Tanzania
Saline lakes of the Great Rift Valley
Geography of Katavi Region
Geography of Rukwa Region
Geography of Songwe Region
Freshwater ecoregions of Africa
Important Bird Areas of Tanzania